Turkish vehicle registration plates are number plates found on Turkish vehicles. The plates use an indirect numbering system associated with the geographical info. In Turkey, number plates are made by authorized private workshops.

Appearance 
Turkish number plate is rectangular in shape and made of aluminium. On the left, there is the country code "TR" in a 4×10 cm blue stripe like in EU countries (without the 12 golden stars). The text is in black characters on white background, and for official vehicles white on black. On all vehicles two plates have to be present, being one in front and the other in rear except motorcycles and tractors. The serial letters use the Turkish letters except Ç, Ş, İ, Ö, Ü and Ğ.

Dimensions

150×240 mm in rear only for motorbikes, motorcycles and tractors with rubber wheels,
110×520 mm in front and rear for cars, 210×320 mm rear available for off-road vehicles, vans, trucks and busses. The size is 150×300 mm for imported vehicles if the regular plate does not fit.

Blue stripe

The blue stripe was introduced after the entry of Turkey to the European Customs Union in 1996, in accordance to compliance to EU laws. Since then, the blue stripe area is often modified by car owners (even by some parliament members like Devlet Bahçeli). The predominant modification of this sorts is to replace the blue color with red crescent and the star of the Turkish flag. This type of modification is in the grey area of the law, for it does not clearly specify which color is to be used in the stripe.

Additionally, vehicle inspection stickers were often stuck on this area.

Numbering system 
The text format on the plates is one of the following:
"34 P 3169", "34 P 03169"
"31 PA 069", "34 PA 3169" or
"31 POR 69", "31 POR 069"

In some provinces, numbering is categorized in groups for tax collecting offices of different districts, for example Dolmuş in Ankara have plates of the form "34 P 3169" and a(ny) vehicle from Polatlı, Ankara has plates of the form '31 POR 69', "06 PO 3169" from Etimesgut district. On the other hand, a Dolmuş in Eskişehir has a plate of the form "26 P 3169".

99 - two digits prefix denoting the location, shows the province code number of the main residence of car holder. There are 81 provinces as listed below:

X/XX/XXX – one, two or three letters.

3169/069/69 – four, three or two digits, depending on the number of letters before, not exceeding six letters and digits altogether.

Types

Location codes 

First two digits indicating the province code:

Province names until code 67 go alphabetically, with the exception of Mersin, Kahramanmaraş and Şanlıurfa provinces for their previous names taken in account were İçel, Maraş and Urfa, respectively. The ones after the original 67 provinces are newer additions, these province names go chronologically.

See also 
 Vehicle registration plate
 Vehicle registration plates of Europe

References

External links
 

Car number plate
Turkey
Vehicle registration
 Registration plates